A hearth son was, in medieval England, a younger son of a landed knight or baron, who due to the laws of feudal inheritance, did not have his own land. Unlike in Anglo-Saxon times, when land was split between surviving sons, during the Middle Ages the eldest son of a landed family inherited the estate entire. As such, younger sons had no income, and resided in a family member's home. There they would live out the rest of their days, most likely unmarried due to the undesirability of an unlanded groom, and waiting for a chance to make it on their own. This term first appears in English lawbooks and is further discussed in the book "William Marshal" by the historian David Crouch.

Feudalism in England